Marco La Piana (1883–1958) was an Italian scholar of Arbëresh origin. La Piana gave his contribute through his studies on Albanian language and Arbëresh dialects.

Biography
La Piana was born in Piana degli Albanesi near Palermo in Sicily. He is the author of a number of studies in Albanian philology, including Il catechismo albanese di Luca Matranga, 1592, da un manoscritto Vaticano (The Albanian Catechism of Lekë Matrënga, 1592, from a Vatican Manuscript), Grottaferrata 1912, Prolegomeni allo studio della linguistica albanese (Introduction to the Study of Albanian Linguistics), Palermo 1939, and Studi linguistici albanesi: i dialetti siculo-albanesi (Albanian Linguistic Studies: The Albanian Dialects of Sicily), Palermo 1949.

See also
Giuseppe Schirò
Demetrio Camarda

References

1883 births
1958 deaths
Albanologists
Linguists from Italy
Italian people of Arbëreshë descent
People from Piana degli Albanesi
19th-century Italian people
20th-century Italian people
19th-century Albanian people
20th-century Albanian people
20th-century linguists